Carolyn Louise Eslick (née Wand, born 1950) is an American politician in Washington state. Eslick serves as a Republican member of the Washington House of Representatives for District 39, Position 2. Eslick is the former mayor and first female mayor of Sultan, Washington.

Education 
In 1979, Eslick studied Computer Programming in Portland State University. In 1998, Eslick studied Political Science in Everett Community College.

Career
Eslick is the former owner of a restaurant in Sultan, Washington. Eslick is the founder of GroWashington.

Eslick was appointed to the Sultan City Council in 1996 and was reelected to the Council in 1998. In 2008, Eslick was elected mayor of Sultan, Washington, until October 2017. Eslick was the first female mayor of Sultan, Washington.

Eslick first ran for the state legislature in 2001, losing in the Republican primary to Dan Kristiansen. In 2014, Eslick lost her campaign for Snohomish County Executive against John Lovick.

Following the resignation of John Koster, Eslick was one of three Republican candidates nominated to fill the vacancy, along with former Representative Elizabeth Scott and Georgene Faries. On September 21, the King, Skagit and Snohomish County Councils voted to confirm Eslick. She was immediately sworn in on September 20, 2017.

Personal life 
In 1979, Eslick moved to Sultan, Washington. Eslick's husband is Chuck. They have six children. Eslick and her family live in Sultan, Washington.

See also
Washington's 39th Legislative District
Washington State Legislature
Washington House of Representatives

References

External links 
 Carolyn Eslick at ballotpedia.org
 Carolyn Eslick at ourcampaigns.com

Washington (state) city council members
Republican Party members of the Washington House of Representatives
Living people
21st-century American politicians
People from Snohomish County, Washington
Women city councillors in Washington (state)
Women state legislators in Washington (state)
21st-century American women politicians
1950 births